Judith Merkle Riley (January 14, 1942 – September 12, 2010) was an American writer, teacher and academic who wrote six historical romance novels.

Biography
Judith Astria Merkle was born in 1942 and grew up in Livermore, California. Her great-uncle was baseball player Fred Merkle. Her father, Theodore Charles Merkle, ran Project Pluto, and her brothers, Ted Merkle DVM is a well respected veterinarian serving Shasta County, Ralph is a pioneer in public key cryptography, and more recently a researcher and speaker on molecular nanotechnology and cryonics. She held a Ph.D. from the University of California at Berkeley and taught in the Department of Government at Claremont McKenna College in Claremont, California.

She wrote six historical fiction novels, starting in 1988.

She was married and had two children, a daughter Elizabeth and a son Marlow.

Riley died on September 12, 2010, from ovarian cancer.

Bibliography

Medieval World of Margaret of Ashbury series
A Vision of Light (1988) 
In Pursuit of the Green Lion (1990) 
The Water-devil (2007)

Single novels
The Oracle Glass (1994) 	
The Serpent Garden	(1996) 
The Master of All Desires (1999)

References

External links
Judith Merkle Riley in Fantastic Fiction

1942 births
2010 deaths
American romantic fiction writers
Deaths from ovarian cancer
Deaths from cancer in California
Novelists from Maine
People from Livermore, California
People from Brunswick, Maine
American women novelists
20th-century American novelists
20th-century American women writers
Women romantic fiction writers
University of California, Berkeley alumni
Claremont McKenna College faculty
Novelists from California
American women academics
21st-century American women